Obed Baloyi (born 1970) is a South African actor and playwright. He won a SAFTA for his performance as TsuTsuma in the sitcom Ga Re Dumele (2010–2019).

Early life
Baloyi is from Diepkloof, Gauteng. He speaks Xitsonga natively as well as English, Zulu, and SeSotho. He attended Shongwezi High School in Malamulele where he first participated in drama productions. He helped out with his mother's food vending growing up. He joined the Melaisizwe theatre group. Upon returning to Johannesburg, Baloyi took acting classes at the Donaldson Orlando Cultural Club (DOCC) under the mentorship of actors such as Darlington Michaels.

Career
In 1996, Baloyi formed the Mangava Drama Group. He wrote the play Ga-Mchangani, which was staged at the Market Theatre and then the Zwakala Festival. His next play Via Soweto premiered at the 1999 Barney Simon Young Directors and Playwrights Festival.

Baloyi turned his focus towards the screen in 2000, making his television debut in the second season of the educational youth show Soul Buddyz. He returned for its fourth season as well, this time playing Prins. He appeared in season 2 of A Place Called Home. He made his feature film debut in Triomf (2008), an adaptation of the 1994 novel by Marlene van Niekerk.

In 2010, Baloyi landed the role of TsuTsuma in Ga Re Dumele , a role he would play for all six seasons of the sitcom. For his performance, Baloyi was nominated twice for Best Actor in a TV Comedy at the South African Film and Television Awards, winning his latter nomination in 2014.

Baloyi starred in the first season of Giyani: Land of Blood on SABC 2 and returned for its second season, this time in a recurring role. From 2021 to 2022, Baloyi was in the main cast of the Mzansi Magic crime drama DiepCity as Ringo. For its second and final season, he was nominated for Best Supporting Actor in a Telenovela at the SAFTAs that year.

Personal life
Baloyi has four children. He is a member of the Zion Christian Church.

Filmography

Film

Television

Stage

Writing credits
 Ga Mchangani (1996)
 Via Soweto (1999)

Awards and nominations

References

External links
 
 Obed Baloyi at TVSA

Living people
1970 births
20th-century South African writers
South African male soap opera actors
South African male stage actors
People from Soweto
Tsonga people